XXX: State of the Union (released as XXX2: The Next Level and XXX: State of Emergency outside North America) is a 2005 American action spy film directed by Lee Tamahori and a sequel to the 2002 film XXX. It is the second installment of the XXX film series, and was produced by Revolution Studios for Columbia Pictures.

Vin Diesel and Rob Cohen, the lead actor and director of the original, had signed onto a sequel before the first film had opened, but both dropped out over scripting issues, while Cohen worked on Stealth. Cohen remained as an executive producer. Ice Cube took over the lead role as the new Triple X agent and Tamahori was brought in to direct, following the huge commercial success of the James Bond film Die Another Day, which he directed. Two different scripts were prepared for the film, and the one written by Simon Kinberg was selected; the other script featured a radically different plot.

State of the Union was a box-office bomb and it was criticized by reviewers, mainly for the performances, an illogical story, and overuse of CGI-based visual effects for most of the action sequences. State of the Union is the last film in the XXX film series to be distributed by Columbia Pictures, as Paramount Pictures became the distributor for its future films, starting with XXX: Return of Xander Cage in 2017.

Plot
In Virginia, unknown assailants breach an underground NSA bunker run by Agent Augustus Gibbon who fends off the attackers before barely escaping with Toby Shavers. To find help from an XXX with more attitude, Gibbons meets his former comrade, Darius Stone, a former U.S. Navy SEAL, who is currently 9-years into his 20-year sentence in Leavenworth for disobeying orders and breaking the jaw of ex-four star General George Deckert, who is now the Secretary of Defence. NSA Agent Kyle Steele, informed that Xander Cage was apparently killed at the same time in Bora Bora, leads the investigation into the attack on the bunker.

Gibbons helps to break Stone out of prison, who then sets himself up as their leader as he mistrusts Gibbons. Stone leads them to meet Zeke, his old partner in crime, and Lola Jackson, his ex-girlfriend, who now runs an exotic car shop. Lola agrees to let Stone, Gibbons, and Shavers hide in her shop in exchange for the '67 GTO that Shavers modified. Stone then infiltrates the NSA bunker, where Gibbons had instructed him to recover a hard drive, while Gibbons returns to his house to recover evidence. However, Deckert and Sergeant Alabama "Bama" Cobb attack and apparently kill Gibbons before destroying the house to cover up the evidence. Stone meets up with Gibbons' contact, Charlie Mayweather, to get information. Charlie directs Stone to a party where Stone recognizes that Deckert's bodyguards are members of his old SEAL Team unit, before overhearing Deckert arguing with General Jack Pettibone VCJCS. Stone goes to Charlie's safe house but is framed for murdering Pettibone, realizing that she is involved in the conspiracy.

The police arrive, and Steele arrives to talk with Stone before escaping. While Shavers hacks into the Pentagon to retrieve Deckert's plans, Steele researches Stone and discovers his imprisonment occurred because when Deckert ordered his SEAL team to start a fire to clear civilians, Stone and half of the unit rebelled, resulting in Stone being court-martialled. Stone infiltrates Deckert's troops aboard an aircraft carrier and discovers Gibbons alive, being held prisoner along with the rest of their SEAL team unit. Stone realizes that the men who sided with him against Deckert 9 years previously are prisoners, while those who stayed loyal are Deckert's security. Mayweather is alerted to Stone's presence, forcing Stone to escape.

After retrieving the plans, Stone learns that Deckert is planning a coup against President James Sanford. Stone contacts Steele and shows him the plans. When Steele notes that his plans are not clear proof, Stone frustratingly leaves, to Steele's initial disbelief. During a conversation with Deckert, Steele realizes Stone was right. He finds Stone and tells him that Deckert wants to kill Sanford and his successors so he can replace Sanford as President, in opposition to Sanford's current plans to dismantle various military presences to focus on foreign aid.

Stone, Steele, and Shavers enlist the aid of Zeke and his crew. Together, they rob a civilian truck that is secretly hauling guns and equipment for the Department of Homeland Security while disguised as a cheese truck. They end up hijacking a tank, and Stone helps Steele penetrate the Capitol building where Sanford's State of the Union Address is being held. A shootout starts, and Gibbons kills Mayweather. Deckert and Cobb abduct Sanford, and with Gibbons now free they escape on a bullet train. Lola arrives with a Ford Shelby Cobra Concept, which Stone uses to chase and infiltrate the train. He engages and kills Cobb before engaging Deckert, while Gibbons flies a helicopter which Steele extracts Sanford by. Stone jumps out after Gibbons derails and destroys the train, killing Deckert.

The story is covered up, and Deckert is buried and branded as a hero. Sanford awards Steele and the unknown soldier (Stone) the Medal of Honor. Stone is officially released from prison, and keeping his promise not to interfere with Lola's life, says his goodbyes and returns to his former lifestyle. In the now-rebuilt NSA Headquarters, Gibbons, Steele, and Shavers discuss potential qualities for the next Triple X agent.

Cast
 Ice Cube as Darius Stone 
 Samuel L. Jackson as Augustus Gibbons
 Willem Dafoe as General George Deckert
 Scott Speedman as NSA Agent Kyle Steele
 Peter Strauss as President James Sanford
 Xzibit as Zeke
 Michael Roof as NSA Agent Toby Shavers
 Sunny Mabrey as Charlie Mayweather
 Nona Gaye as Lola Jackson
 John G. Connolly as Alabama Cobb
 Ramon De Ocampo as NSA Agent Meadows

Soundtrack

A soundtrack containing hip hop and alternative rock was released on April 26, 2005, through Jive Records. It peaked at #117 on the Billboard 200, #48 on the Top R&B/Hip-Hop Albums chart, and #5 on the Top Soundtracks chart.

Sequel

Reception

Box office
XXX: State of the Union grossed $26.9 million in the United States and Canada and $44.2 million in other territories, for a worldwide total of $71.1 million, against a reported production budget of $60 million. According to The Wrap.com the production budget was a reported $87 million, but Revolution Studios spent a total of $113.1 million.

It opened on April 29, 2005 and grossed $12.7 million in its opening weekend, finishing third at the box office.

Critical response
On Rotten Tomatoes the film has an approval rating of 17%, based on 137 reviews, with an average rating of 3.84/10. The site's critical consensus reads, "Even more absurd and implausible than the first xXx movie, State of the Union is less inspired and technically competent than its predecessor." On Metacritic, the film has a score of 37%, based on reviews from 31 critics, indicating "generally unfavorable reviews". Audiences surveyed by CinemaScore gave the film a grade B+ on scale of A to F.

Boo Allen of the Denton Record Chronicle called Ice Cube's XXX character "a chubby, surly, incomprehensible action hero". Brian Orndorf of FilmJerk.com compared watching the film to running "headfirst at top speed into a brick wall". David Hiltbrand of the Philadelphia Inquirer said "the plot swings between pathetically implausible and aggressively stupid". Some critics liked the film. Mack Bates of the Milwaukee Journal Sentinel praised Ice Cube's "trademark charisma and street sensibility," while Owen Gleiberman of Entertainment Weekly called it "that rare B movie that’s rooted in gut-level stirrings of power and retaliation". Paul Arendt of the BBC said, "Viewed on its own trashy terms, it succeeds brilliantly".

References

External links
 
 
 
 
 

2
2005 films
2005 action thriller films
2000s spy films
Techno-thriller films
American action thriller films
American spy films
Columbia Pictures films
2000s English-language films
Films about fictional presidents of the United States
Films directed by Lee Tamahori
Films produced by Neal H. Moritz
Films set in Virginia
Films set in Washington, D.C.
Films set in the White House
Films shot in Baltimore
Films shot in California
Films shot in Los Angeles
Films shot in Washington, D.C.
Films set on trains
Revolution Studios films
Films with screenplays by Simon Kinberg
American sequel films
Films scored by Marco Beltrami
Original Film films
Films about coups d'état
2000s American films
American spy action films